The gallery of passport stamps by country or territory contains an alphabetical list of sovereign states or dependent territories with images of their passport stamps including visas. All Schengen countries, Bulgaria, Cyprus and Romania use the same format for their stamps, and stamps are not issued while traveling from one Schengen country to another.

List

Others

See also
 List of passports

Notes

References

External links
 Passport stamps from the whole world - 181 countries, 748 scans

Passport stamps
Image galleries